Bağözü is a village in the Kâhta District of Adıyaman Province in Turkey. The village is populated by Kurds of the Reşwan tribe and had a population of 98 in 2021.

References 

Kurdish settlements in Adıyaman Province
Villages in Kâhta District